USS Carib (AT-82) was a  constructed for the United States Navy during World War II. Her purpose was to aid ships, usually by towing, on the high seas or in combat or post-combat areas, plus "other duties as assigned." She served in the Atlantic Ocean and the Pacific Ocean.

The second U.S. Navy ship to be named Carib, she was launched 7 February 1943 by Charleston Shipbuilding and Dry Dock Co., Charleston, South Carolina; sponsored by Mrs. N. R. Wade; and commissioned 24 July 1943.

World War II Atlantic Ocean operations 
Carib cleared Norfolk, Virginia, 3 September 1943 for duty under Commander, Service Force, Atlantic. She arrived at Recife, Brazil, 17 October, and through June 1944 operated along the coast of Brazil on local escort, towing and salvage duty. This important support aided in the successful antisubmarine and escort operations of the South Atlantic Force.

Transfer to the Pacific Ocean 
Through the next year, she aided in the development of anti-submarine equipment at Quonset Point, Rhode Island, and at Port Everglades, Florida. The fleet tug cleared Port Everglades on 1 June 1945 for the Pacific, towing barracks craft (non-self propelled) APL-28 to the Panama Canal Zone, and then the 10,000-ton concrete floating drydock ARDC-2 to Pearl Harbor.
 
Carib towed battle rafts to Eniwetok and Okinawa, and at Buckner Bay on 21 October reported to the U.S. 5th Fleet's Service Squadron 10. Towing jobs in support of the occupation of Japan and redeployments in China took Carib to Japan and Shanghai from Okinawa until 9 January 1946. The tug towed stores ship  to Subic Bay, Philippine Islands, arriving 6 February, and operated in the Philippines until 6 April.

Post-war decommissioning 
Carib returned to San Pedro, California, 29 May, and on 24 January 1947 was placed out of commission in reserve, berthed at San Diego, California. She was struck from the Naval Register, 1 July 1963, and sold to Colombia, under the Security Assistance Program, 14 February 1978 and renamed ARC Pedro de Heredia. Final Disposition was to be sunk by the Colombian Navy in June 2007.

Colombian Navy 
In March 1979 in Alameda, California, the unit was reactivated in the shipyard Tod Shipyard with the first Colombian crew, the first sea test was on 30 July 1979, and the official day of incorporation to the Colombian Navy was 7 August 1979, the last commanding officer was The Master Chief Rafael Darío Valverde Burgos.
The Colombia Seal for the 5KLE:

References

External links 
 

 

Cherokee-class fleet tugs
Ships built in Charleston, South Carolina
World War II auxiliary ships of the United States
1943 ships
Cherokee-class fleet tugs of the Colombian Navy